Parva also known as Parawa is a village in Parbhani taluka of Parbhani district of Maharashtra state in India.

Demography
According to the 2011 census of India, Parva had a population of 2218, of which 1135 were male and 1084 were female. The average sex ratio of the village was 956, which was higher than the Maharashtra state average of 929. The literacy rate was 62.34% compared to 82.3% for the state. Male literacy rate was 74% while female literacy rate was 59%.

Geography and Transport
Following table shows distance of Parva from some of major cities.

References

Villages in Parbhani district